Sam Wells (born 13 July 1984, at Dunedin, Otago, New Zealand) is a New Zealand cricketer who plays for Otago in the Plunket Shield. He is a middle-order batsman and medium-pace bowler.

Career
Wells made his first-class debut for the Otago cricket team in the 2007–08 State Championship against Central Districts and made 20 runs in that match, batting at number eight. Wells became especially consistent as an allrounder, especially in first-class cricket, with maiden hundreds and five-wicket hauls. With the bat, his breakthrough season came in 2009–10, where he established himself with 478 runs from 7 matches inclusive of two centuries and three half-centuries. His consistency remained in the 2010–11 and 2011–12 seasons, where he scored three half-centuries each. Three half-centuries from four games and the same number of half-centuries from the same number of games the following season underlined his consistency. Unfortunately, he could not play much in the 2010–11 season as he was injured and that cut his season short.

Wells was a promising bowler from his debut in the 2007–08 season, but like his batting, his breakthrough season came in the 2009–10 season. He took 21 wickets in the State Championship including two five-wicket hauls and career-best figures of 5-26. This was followed by 4 wickets in his short 2010–11 season, and 2 wickets the following season.

He was selected to play for a New Zealand XI to play in a warm-up match against the Zimbabweans ahead of their one-off Test match against New Zealand. At Harry Barker Reserve, the New Zealand XI were reduced to 59/4 when Wells came to the crease and played a brilliant, aggressive innings that hauled New Zealand XI out of trouble. His 65 off 85 balls included seven fours and a six. He also scored 5 not out in the second innings in a drawn match.

Following this brilliant performance, New Zealand Cricket drafted him into the national Test squad to face Zimbabwe at Napier. Experienced New Zealand coach John Wright said that he is a talented allrounder and that they are confident that if the opportunity arises, he will perform to his potential. Wright stated that the reason behind Wells's drafting into the Test squad was on the back of his fine performances in the tour game in which he also took a wicket (Ray Price) and that "will further balance the team".

Wells graduated from the University of Otago with a law degree in 2007, and was admitted to the bar in 2014. He works in litigation at the Dunedin law firm Gallaway Cook Allan.

See also
 List of Otago representative cricketers

References

External links

1984 births
Living people
New Zealand cricketers
Otago cricketers
Cricketers from Dunedin
University of Otago alumni
21st-century New Zealand lawyers